Sarawan (Balochi: سراوان) was a division of the former princely state of Kalat in Baluchistan, Pakistan, with an area . To the north were Quetta, Pishin, Bolan Pass and Sibi District. On the south was the division of Jhalawan. The main mountain ranges are Nagau, Bhaur, Zamuri hills, Bangulzai hills with the peaks of Moro, Dilband and Harboi.

History

Sarawan tribal area was ruled by many empires including the Ghaznavid Empire and Ghorid empires, until the end of the 15th century. In 1666, Mir Aḥmad Khan Qambrani was ruler of Khanate of Kalat. In 1758, Muhammad Nasir Khan I came into power. Nasir Khan II was brought on throne by Sarawan tribesmen in the 1840.

See also 
 Baluchistan Agency

References

15th century in Asia
17th century in Asia
Khanate of Kalat